Commercial Hotel is a heritage-listed former hotel at 430-436 Smollett Street, Albury, City of Albury, New South Wales, Australia. It was formerly known as Waterstreet Hotel. The property is owned by Cohalan & Mitchell Roofing Pty Ltd, Lavington Plaster Linings Pty Ltd, Layisa Pty Ltd and Waterstreet Property Pty Ltd. It was added to the New South Wales State Heritage Register on 2 April 1999.

History 
Another source says it was built even earlier, in 1844, by James Wyse.

Modifications were made to the hotel in  when a two-storey front verandah was constructed with timber floors and cast iron fretwork. In  an architect-designed two-storey rear accommodation wing was constructed. In  the ground floor windows were replaced with P&O style fenestration and concrete awning.

The hotel was owned by Mrs Waterstreet in 1914, giving its eponymous title. In 1929 it was reported that the Waterhouse family leased the hotel.

During 2003 and 2005 unsympathetic prior alterations to the building interiors were removed, such as suspended ceilings, exposing original ceiling heights and plaster detailing.

The hotel was later sold and converted into apartments.

Heritage listing 

The Commercial Hotel was listed on the New South Wales State Heritage Register on 2 April 1999.

The hotel, dating from the 1850s with an 1880s verandah and 1912 architect-designed accommodation wing, is believed to be the oldest public hotel in Albury. It was described as an early commercial response to the railway and as a good example of a late colonial style country hotel.

References

Attribution

External links

New South Wales State Heritage Register
Albury, New South Wales
1854 establishments in Australia
Albury
Hotels established in 1854